The 2011 population census in Bulgaria was conducted between February 1 and 28 by the National Statistical Institute (NSI). It is the 17th population census in the demographic history of Bulgaria. It was carried out using two methods of information collection - electronically (1-9 February 2011) through an on-line census on the Internet and traditionally through visits by enumerators and the completion of a paper census card (10-28 February 2011). For the first time in Bulgaria, a census is being conducted via the Internet. As of February 1 2011, the population of Bulgaria was 7,364,570, of whom 3,777,999 (51.3%) were women and 3,586,571 (48.7%) were men.

Results

Settlements 
Distribution of settlements according to the size of their population as of February 1, 2011:

Age-sex structure 
Age-sex structure of the population:

Ethnic composition 

Population and percentage of ethnic groups by district:

Municipalities 

Number and percentage of ethnic groups by municipality:

Native language 
Population distribution by ethnic group and native language as of February 1, 2011 (people who answered both questions are shown):

Religion 
Number and percentage of the population by religion, by district:

See also 

 Demographics of Bulgaria

References

External links 

2011 in Bulgaria
Censuses in Bulgaria